Amys Creek is a stream in Habersham County, Georgia, and is a tributary of the Chattahoochee River.

Course

Amys Creek rises in the northwestern corner of Habersham County, Georgia, at the foot of Irwin Mountain, and just north of State Route 17. The creek runs southeast parallel to State Route 17, then turns south and crosses both State Route 17 and State Route 255, before flowing into the Chattahoochee River less than 1 mile south of State Route 255.

Sub-watershed details
The creek watershed is designated by the United States Geological Survey as sub-watershed HUC 031300010105, is named Amys Creek-Chattahoochee River sub-watershed, and drains an area of approximately 20 square miles northwest of Clarkesville, and east of the Chattahoochee River.  In addition to Amys Creek, which is joined by Amos Creek from the north, the area is drained by Car Creek and Mauldin Mill Creek to the west of Amys Creek, both of which flow into the Chattahoochee north of where Amys Creek joins the river.

See also
 Water Resource Region
 South Atlantic-Gulf Water Resource Region
 Apalachicola basin

References 

Amys Creek (Chattahoochee River)
Rivers of Habersham County, Georgia